The 2004 Pan American Trampoline and Tumbling Championships were held in Tampa, United States, July 20–21, 2004. The event was the  inaugural edition of the Pan American Trampoline and Tumbling Championships.

Medalists

Medal table

References

2004 in gymnastics
Pan American Gymnastics Championships
International gymnastics competitions hosted by the United States
2004 in American sports